The Fueguian People's Movement (MOPOF) is a provincial political party in the Tierra del Fuego Province of Argentina. It was formed in 1985, becoming the first provincial political party in Tierra del Fuego, and was, for most of its history, one of the main political parties in the province.

Electoral results

Chamber of Deputies

Senate

Tierra del Fuego governorship

Tierra del Fuego provincial legislature

Notes

References

Provincial political parties in Argentina
Tierra del Fuego Province, Argentina
Peronist parties and alliances in Argentina